Mena City Hall, also known as the Old Post Office, is the city hall of Mena, Arkansas, located at 520 North Mena Street.  It is a two-story brick building with Classical Revival and Colonial Revival features, designed by Treasury architect James Wetmore and built in 1917.  Its elaborate lobby decorations are still visible despite the building's conversion for use as city hall.  Its exterior features a Classical pedimented portico, and an entrance topped by a Colonial Revival fanlight.

The building was listed on the National Register of Historic Places in 1991.

See also 

National Register of Historic Places listings in Polk County, Arkansas
List of United States post offices

References 

City and town halls on the National Register of Historic Places in Arkansas
Colonial Revival architecture in Arkansas
Neoclassical architecture in Arkansas
Government buildings completed in 1917
Buildings and structures in Polk County, Arkansas
City halls in Arkansas
National Register of Historic Places in Polk County, Arkansas
Historic district contributing properties in Arkansas